The 2017 FIBA Under-16 Asian Championship (also known as the 2018 FIBA Under-16 Asian Championship) was the qualifying tournament for FIBA Asia at the 2018 FIBA Under-17 Basketball World Cup. The tournament was held in Foshan, China from 2 to 8 April 2018. The competition was scheduled to be played in Dalang, China from 26 March to 1 April 2018. The top four teams would represent FIBA Asia to the 2018 FIBA U17 Basketball World Cup.

Qualification 

Aside from the host nation and the defending champions, each of FIBA Asia's six subzones also gets one berth each, except for the Persian Gulf and West Asian subzones, which were allocated two berths each. Rounding out the 16-team tournament are the four berths that would be added to each subzone, depending on its teams' performance in the previous championship. Also noted is the participation of FIBA Oceania teams from Australia and New Zealand.

Qualified teams 
Initially, sixteen (16) teams were named as qualified to compete, but according to the tournament's official website, there were only thirteen (13) teams left to participate.

 Host Nation (1)
 
 Defending Champions (1)
 
 Central Asia (1)
 
 East Asia (4)
 
 
 
 

 Persian Gulf (2)
 
 
 South Asia (1)
 
 Southeast Asia (2)
 
 
 West Asia (2)
 
 
 FIBA Oceania (2)

Format
This edition of the tournament will be having a different format as compared to what was used since 2009. While there would still be a preliminary round robin of four groups of four teams, the single-elimination final round immediately follows the preliminary round. In the final round, the teams that finished second and third in their respective groups would play in the qualifications to quarterfinals of the final round, while the group winners automatically qualify to the quarterfinals proper.

Draw
The official draw was held on 6 March 2017 in Beijing.

Preliminary round
All times are local (UTC+8).

Group A

Group B

Group C

Group D

Final round

Bracket

Classification 5th–8th

Playoffs

Quarterfinals

5–8th place semifinals

Semifinals

Seventh place game

Fifth place game

Third place game

Final

Final standing

Statistics

Player tournament averages

Team tournament averages

Tournament game highs

Awards

All-Tournament Team
 C  Kai Zachary Sotto
 F  Luke Jackson
 F  Wani Swaka Lo Buluk
 G  Sun Haoqin
 G  Tamuri Wigness

Referees
The following referees were selected for the tournament.

  Gao Xin
  He Luwei
  Yuan Ningpeng
  Chan Ho Ming
  Cheung Kwok Shun Andy
  Biswajit Ojha
  Mohammad Doost
  Mohsen Roshan Zamir
  Kihamu Matsumoto
  Ryoko Odanaka
  Kim Cheong-soo
  Lee Kyoung-hwan
  Chu Wei Chuen
  Martin Davison
  Dallas Christian Pickering
  Ricor Buaron
  Ferdinand Pascual
  Huang Chen-yu

References 

2017
2017–18 in Asian basketball
International basketball competitions hosted by China
April 2018 sports events in Asia